Uberabatitan (meaning "Uberaba titan", in reference to where it was found) is a genus of titanosaurian sauropod dinosaur from the Late Cretaceous of Brazil.  It is known from bones including neck, back, and tail vertebrae, pelvic bones, and limb bones.  These fossils were found in the uppermost portion of the Maastrichtian-age Serra da Galga Formation of the Bauru Group, in Uberaba, Minas Gerais.  The type species, described by Salgado and Carvalho in 2008, is U. ribeiroi. To date, it is the most recent titanosaur from Bauru Group rocks; other titanosaurs from the Bauru Group, including Baurutitan and Trigonosaurus, come from lower (thus older) levels. Like other sauropods, Uberabatitan would have been a large quadrupedal herbivore.

A 2019 redescription of assigned and new material from the same locality places Uberabatitan as a non-saltasaurid lithostrotian with an upper body size estimate for large individuals at 26 meters.

References

Late Cretaceous dinosaurs of South America
Titanosaurs
Fossil taxa described in 2008
Marília Formation